Piia-Noora Kauppi (born 7 January 1975, in Oulu) is the managing director of the  (2008) and a former Member of the European Parliament (MEP)  of the European People's Party (1999-2008).

Kauppi has a Master of Laws degree. She also studied economics at the Helsinki School of Economics and took some post-graduate studies at Harvard and Yale in the United States.

Political activities 
In gymnasium, Kauppi joined the National Coalition Party because it supported Finland joining the European Communities. She was actively involved in the Coalition Party Youth League and was its Oulu region president in 1993–1994, and the League's vice president in 1996–1997.

After graduating as LL.M., Kauppi acted as deputy group secretary and legislative secretary for the National Coalition Party parliamentary group in 1997–1999. At the same time she was involved in local politics in Oulu as member of the city council and city board in 1996–1999. She was also the vice president of the North Ostrobothnia chapter of the National Coalition Party in 1998–2006.

Kauppi was elected in the European Parliament twice: first in 1999, and again in 2004 with 62,995 votes. She was and still is the youngest Finnish person to have been elected as MEP.

In the Parliament in 2004–2006 Kauppi was a member in the Committee on Economic and Monetary Affairs, Committee on Legal Affairs, and the Committee on Women's Rights and Gender Equality. She was focused especially on legislatory projects that concerned the financial market. Kauppi was also a member in the Parliament's Delegation with the United States, and during her second period was also a member of the Inter-Parliamentary Delegation with China.

Kauppi was president of the European Parliamentary Financial Services Forum, vice-president of the SME Union, and a member of the European Internet Foundation (EIF). In 2000 she was involved with founding the Campaign for Parliamentary Reform together with other members such as Sweden's current commissioner Cecilia Malmström, Denmark's prime minister Helle Thorning-Schmidt and the UK deputy prime minister Nick Clegg. The group was joined in 2004 by Finland's current Minister for Foreign Affairs Alexander Stubb. The group campaigned e.g. for a single seat for the Parliament, transparency in the compensation of travel expenses, the option of electronic signing of legislatory proposals, and a reform of the Parliament's interpretation policy.

During her political career, Kauppi focused especially on the constitutional development of the EU. She was e.g. the Parliament's representative in the European Convention to draft new treaties. She supported further opening the single market, transatlantic co-operation, seizing the possibilities of the European information society, and single supervision of European banking.

Federation of Finnish Financial Services 
Kauppi left the European Parliament on 1 January 2009 to become Managing Director of the Federation of Finnish Financial Services, a lobbying group. For this move she received an award for "Worst conflict of interest" at the "Worst EU lobbying Awards". According to the organisers she had for a long time been advocating interests of the European banking industry as an MEP by working against regulations for the sector. For example, in 2005 she was reported by The Wall Street Journal to have supported the banking lobby with watering down regulations against money-laundering. The organisers of the awards question her qualification to continuously participate in regulation efforts for a sector she would later be lobbying for.

References

External links
 Homepage
 Piia-Noora Kauppi (piianoora) on Twitter

1975 births
Living people
People from Oulu
MEPs for Finland 1999–2004
MEPs for Finland 2004–2009
20th-century women MEPs for Finland
21st-century women MEPs for Finland
National Coalition Party MEPs
Harvard Kennedy School alumni
Aalto University alumni